This list of churches in Oxford records churches in the city of Oxford, England. Oxford's "Dreaming Spires" refer to the medieval churches and colleges that continue to dominate the city.

Church of England

 Christ Church Cathedral, St Aldate's
 All Saints, Lime Walk, Headington
 Holy Trinity Church, Headington Quarry
 Pusey House, St Giles' Street
 St Alban the Martyr, Charles Street
 St Aldate's, St Aldate's Street
 St Andrew, St Andrew's Road, Headington
 St Andrew, Linton Road
 St Barnabas, Cardigan Street, Jericho
 St Bartholomew's Chapel, Bartlemas, Cowley Road
 St Clement, Marston Road
 St Ebbe's, Pennyfarthing Place
 St Francis of Assisi, Hollow Way, Cowley
 St Frideswide, Botley Road
 St Giles, Woodstock Road
 St James, Beauchamp Lane, Cowley
 St John the Evangelist, Iffley Road
 St John the Evangelist, Vicarage Road
 St Luke, Canning Crescent
 St Margaret's, St Margaret's Road
 St Mary Magdalen, Magdalen Street
 St Mary, Bayswater Road, Barton
 St Mary and St John, Cowley Road
 St Mary the Virgin, Iffley
 St Matthew, Marlborough Road
 St Michael and All Angels, Lonsdale Road, Summertown
 St Michael and All Angels, Marston Road, New Marston
 St Michael at the Northgate, Cornmarket Street
 St Thomas the Martyr, Becket Street
 University Church of St Mary the Virgin, High Street

Roman Catholic
 St Aloysius Gonzaga, (The Oxford Oratory), 25 Woodstock Road
 St Anthony of Padua, 115 Headley Way
 Blackfriars, 64 St Giles'
 Corpus Christi, 88 Wharton Road, Headington
 Blessed Dominic Barberi, Oxford Road, Littlemore
 Our Lady Help of Christians, 59 Hollow Way, Cowley
 Sacred Heart, Sawpit Road, Blackbird Leys
 St Edmund of Abingdon and St Frideswide, (Greyfriars), 182 Iffley Road
 SS Gregory and Augustine, 322 Woodstock Road
 Holyrood Church (Hinksey Parish), Abingdon Road
 Catholic Chaplaincy, Rose Place, St Aldate's
 Oxford Brookes Catholic Chaplaincy, 62 London Road, Headington

Evangelical (affiliated to Fellowship of Independent Evangelical Churches)
 Magdalen Road Church, Magdalen Road, Oxford.
 Marston Neighbourhood Church, Marston Road, Oxford.
 Trinity Church Oxford, A new evangelical church plant (September 2013 launch).
 Woodstock Road Baptist Church, 198 Woodstock Road, Oxford.

Baptist
 New Road Baptist Church, Bonn Square
 Headington Baptist Church
 Botley Baptist, Westminster Way, Botley
 John Bunyan Baptist Church, Crowell Road
 Oxford Baptist Chapel, a Christ-centered, Gospel preaching church  (Albert Street, Jericho)
 Woodstock Road Baptist Church, an evangelical church, 198 Woodstock Road, Oxford
  People's Baptist Church (International Baptist Church) Crowell Road

Methodist
 Wesley Memorial Methodist Church, New Inn Hall Street
 The Methodist Church, Lime Walk
 Rose Hill Methodist Church
 Cowley Road Methodist Church

United Reformed
 Collinwood Road United Reformed Church, Risinghurst
 Marston United Reformed Church, Marston Road
 St Columba's United Reformed Church, Alfred Street
 Summertown United Reformed Church
 Temple Cowley United Reformed Church

Ecumenical
 Holy Family Church, 1 Cuddesdon Way (Anglican, Methodist, Baptist, United Reformed, Moravian)

Non-denominational churches
Beersheba International Faith Church
 Sword for the Lord.Oxford, West Oxford Community Centre, Botley Road, Oxford

Other denominations

 Apostolic Faith Church of Oxford, United Pentecostal Church in Oxford 
 Bethel Gospel Church, The Holy Family Church, 1 Cuddesdon Way, Blackbird Leys
 Cornerstone Church Assemblies of God, Quarry High Street, Headington, Oxford
 Calvary Chapel, meets in Botley Primary school
 Chinese Christian Church, 15 Gorse Leas
 Christ Embassy Oxford Church
 Christian Life Centre Church
 Deeper Life Bible Church
 Elim Pentecostal, Botley Road
 First Church of Christ, Scientist, Oxford, 36a St Giles'
 German Lutheran services at St Mary the Virgin, High Street
 Grace Springs Church
 Greater World Spiritualist Church, Cowley Road, Cowley, Oxford
 Jesus Army
 Hillsong Church, meets in Odeon Cinema, Magdalen Street
 James Street Church Open Brethren
 Kingsway International Christian Centre (KICC) Oxford Branch. The Barn, Nightingale Avenue
 Living Faith international
 Oxford Unitarians at Harris Manchester College Chapel, Mansfield Road
 Orthodox Church of the Holy Trinity and the Annuciation, 1 Canterbury Road (off Banbury Road)
 St Nicholas Russian Orthodox Church, 34 Ferry Road
 Oxford Bible Church
 Oxford Christadelphian Church, Tyndale Road.
 Oxford Community Church (OCC), Osney Mead
 Oxford Vineyard
 People's Baptist Church (International Baptist Church)
 Redeemed Christian Church of God, Barton Neighbourhood Centre, Headington, Oxford.
 Oxford Quaker Meeting (Religious Society of Friends), 43 St Giles 
 Pentecostal Church in Oxford, Victory Worship Centre, Malayalam Church Oxford , Tamil Church Oxford, Kanada Church Oxford, Telugu Church Oxford Pentecostal church, Oxford Services at Cherwell School, North Site
 RCCG Lighthouse Parish, at Abingdon, Oxford and Witney
 Rivers of Life Church, Marston Road
 The Salvation Army, Oxford Citadel, Lytham Street
 Word Fountain Christian Ministries, Hollow Way, Cowley

Former churches
 St John the Baptist, Middle Way, Summertown (demolished 1924)
 St Martin's Church, Carfax (part demolished, only Carfax Tower survives)
 Chapel of St Mary at Smith Gate (now the Middle Common Room of Hertford College)
 St Paul's, Walton Street (deconsecrated, now "Freud's" bar)
 St Philip and St James Church, Woodstock Road (now the Oxford Centre for Mission Studies)

One church has been converted to a college chapel:
 St Peter-le-Bailey, New Inn Hall Street, now the chapel of St Peter's College, Oxford

Three churches have been converted into college libraries:
 All Saints, High Street, now the library of Lincoln College
 St Cross, St Cross Road, now the historic collections centre (i.e. archive of manuscripts, rare books etc.) of Balliol College
 St Peter-in-the-East, Queen's Lane, now the library of St Edmund Hall

See also
 City Church, Oxford

References

External links
 Diocese of Oxford information. Anglicans Online official website. Retrieval date: 5 December 2007.
 Oxford Diocesan website. Retrieval date: 5 December 2007.
 Church listings, Google Maps

Oxford-related lists
Lists of buildings and structures in Oxfordshire
Oxford
Oxford